Tarald is a given name. Notable people with the given name include:

Tarald Brautaset (born 1946), Norwegian diplomat
Tarald Weisteen (1916–2010), Norwegian military officer
Knut Tarald Taraldsen (born 1948), Norwegian linguist

Norwegian given names